Lobesia kurokoi is a moth of the family Tortricidae. It is found in Thailand.

References

Moths described in 1995
Olethreutini